In analytical and organic chemistry, elution is the process of extracting one material from another by washing with a solvent; as in washing of loaded ion-exchange resins to remove captured ions.

In a liquid chromatography experiment, for example, an analyte is generally adsorbed, or "bound to", an adsorbent in a liquid chromatography column. The adsorbent, a solid phase (stationary phase), is a powder which is coated onto a solid support. Based on an adsorbent's composition, it can have varying affinities to "hold" onto other molecules—forming a thin film on the surface of its particles. Elution then is the process of removing analytes from the adsorbent by running a solvent, called an "eluent", past the adsorbent/analyte complex. As the solvent molecules "elute", or travel down through the chromatography column, they can either pass by the adsorbent/analyte complex or they can displace the analyte by binding to the adsorbent in its place. After the solvent molecules displace the analyte, the analyte can be carried out of the column for analysis. This is why as the mobile phase passes out of the column, it typically flows into a detector or is collected for compositional analysis. 

Predicting and controlling the order of elution is a key aspect of column chromatographic methods.

Eluotropic series
An eluotropic series is  listing of various compounds in order of eluting power for a given adsorbent. The "eluting power" of a solvent is largely a measure of how well the solvent can "pull" an analyte off the adsorbent to which it is attached. This often happens when the eluent adsorbs onto the stationary phase, displacing the analyte. Such series are useful for determining necessary solvents needed for chromatography of chemical compounds. Normally such a series progresses from non-polar solvents, such as n-hexane, to polar solvents such as methanol or water. The order of solvents in an eluotropic series depends both on the stationary phase as well as on the compound used to determine the order.

Eluent
The eluent or eluant is the "carrier" portion of the mobile phase. It moves the analytes through the chromatograph. In liquid chromatography, the eluent is the liquid solvent; in gas chromatography, it is the carrier gas.

Eluate
The eluate is the analyte material that emerges from the chromatograph. It specifically includes both the analytes and solutes passing through the column, while the eluent is only the carrier.

Elution time and elution volume
The "elution time" of a solute is the time between the start of the separation (the time at which the solute enters the column) and the time at which the solute elutes.  In the same way, the elution volume is the volume of eluent required to cause elution.  Under standard conditions for a known mix of solutes in a certain technique, the elution volume may be enough information to identify solutes.  For instance, a mixture of amino acids may be separated by ion-exchange chromatography.  Under a particular set of conditions, the amino acids will elute in the same order and at the same elution volume.

Antibody elution
Antibody elution is the process of removing antibodies that are attached to their targets, such as the surface of red blood cells. Techniques include using heat, a freeze/thaw cycle, ultrasound, acids or organic solvents. No single method is best in all situations.

See also
 Chromatography
 Desorption
 Gradient elution in high performance liquid chromatography
 Leaching

References

External links
 Chemistry glossary
 Eluotropic series

Analytical chemistry
Chromatography